The canton of Auxonne is an administrative division of the Côte-d'Or department, eastern France. Its borders were modified at the French canton reorganisation which came into effect in March 2015. Its seat is in Auxonne.

It consists of the following communes:
 
Athée
Auxonne
Billey
Binges
Champdôtre
Cirey-lès-Pontailler
Cléry
Drambon
Étevaux
Flagey-lès-Auxonne
Flammerans
Heuilley-sur-Saône
Labergement-lès-Auxonne
Lamarche-sur-Saône
Magny-Montarlot
Les Maillys
Marandeuil
Maxilly-sur-Saône
Montmançon
Perrigny-sur-l'Ognon
Poncey-lès-Athée
Pont
Pontailler-sur-Saône
Saint-Léger-Triey
Saint-Sauveur
Soirans
Soissons-sur-Nacey
Talmay
Tellecey
Tillenay
Tréclun
Vielverge
Villers-les-Pots
Villers-Rotin
Vonges

References

Cantons of Côte-d'Or